WHJG-LP (93.3 FM) is an American low-power FM radio station licensed to serve the community of Rockford, Illinois. The station, established in 2005, is owned and operated as a ministry of the Pelley Road Christian Fellowship.

Programming
WHJG-LP broadcasts a Christian talk and teaching format to the Rockford/Cherry Valley/Valley View area. Featured hosts and teachers include Charles Stanley, Chuck Swindoll, Adrian Rogers, D. James Kennedy, Jay Sekulow, Kay Arthur, Jack Hayford, and Brannon Howse. WHJG also airs a Spanish language block of programming on Sunday afternoons, which includes Spanish language versions of Charles Stanley and Adrian Rogers's programs.

History
In September 2000, Pelley Road Christian Fellowship applied to the Federal Communications Commission (FCC) for a construction permit for a new low-power broadcast radio station to serve Rockford, Illinois. The FCC granted this permit on May 19, 2003, with a scheduled expiration date of November 19, 2004. The new station was assigned call sign "WHJG-LP" on June 24, 2003. After construction and testing were completed in November 2004, the station was granted its broadcast license on May 19, 2005.

References

External links

 WHJG's official website
 

HJG-LP
HJG-LP
Radio stations established in 2005
Mass media in Rockford, Illinois